Yenidal is a village in the Solhan District, Bingöl Province, Turkey. The village is populated by Kurds of the Solaxan tribe and had a population of 1,009 in 2021.

The hamlets of Altınsu, Durmuşlu, Efendideresi, Eskiköy, Kayalar, Küçük, Sarıbaşak, Soğuksu, Şerefmeydanı, Taşlıdere, Taşoluk and Ziyaret are attached to the village.

References 

Villages in Solhan District
Kurdish settlements in Bingöl Province